Əmirvar (also, Emirvar) is a village and municipality in the Dashkasan District of Azerbaijan. It has a population of 803. The municipality consists of the villages of Emirvar and Gazakhly.

References 

Populated places in Dashkasan District